The Chipmunks Sing with Children is an album by Alvin and the Chipmunks with David Seville. It was released on January 1, 1965, by Liberty Records.

Track listing

Tracks 8 and 10 were reissued on The Chipmunks Go to the Movies (1969)

Production
Credits adapted from 1965 vinyl release.

Ross Bagdasarian – Alvin, Simon, Theodore, David Seville
Jimmy Joyce Children's Chorus – chorus
Pete King – arranger
Bob Doherty – engineer
Rober Marshutz – cover photograph

References

1965 albums
Alvin and the Chipmunks albums
Liberty Records albums
Albums produced by Ross Bagdasarian